This is a list of brewing companies in Germany. Beer is a major part of German culture. For many years German beer was brewed in adherence to the Reinheitsgebot order or law which only permitted  water, hops, yeast and malt as beer ingredients. The order also required that beers not exclusively using barley-malts, such as wheat beer, must be top-fermented.

Since 1993, the production of beer has been governed by the Provisional German Beer Law which allows a greater range of ingredients (only in top-fermenting beers) and additives that have to be completely, or at least as much as possible, removed from the final product.

Brewing companies in Germany

  Aktienbrauerei Kaufbeuren
  Aldersbach brewery
  Augustiner Bräu 
  Ayinger Brewery 
  Bavaria – St. Pauli Brewery 
  Beck's Brewery
  Bitburger Brewery 
  Brau Holding International
  
  
  Brauerei Gebr. Maisel
  Brauerei Friedmann
  
  
  
  Brauerei Paderborner 
  
  Brauhaus am Kreuzberg
  Bürgerliches Brauhaus 
  Cölner Hofbräu Früh 
  Diebels
  Dinkelacker 
  Dortmunder Actien Brauerei 
  
  Eichbaum 
  Einbecker Brewery 
  Erdinger 
  Ernst Barre Private Brewery
  Familienbrauerei Bauhöfer
  Flensburger Brauerei 
  G. Schneider & Sohn 
  Gaffel Becker & Co 
  
  Ganter Brewery 
  Gardelegener Braugesellschaft mbH & Co. KG 
  Gröninger 
  Hacker-Pschorr Brewery 
  Hasseröder 
  Heinrich Reissdorf 
  Henninger Brewery 
  
  Herrenhäuser Brewery 
  Hofbräuhaus
  Holsten Brewery 
  Janssen and Bechly Brewery 
  Jever Brewery 
  Karlsberg
  Klosterbrauerei Andechs
  
  König Brauerei 
  König Ludwig Schlossbrauerei 
  Königsbacher 
  Köstritzer 
  Krombacher Brauerei
  
  Kuchlbauer Brewery
  Kulmbacher Brewery 
  Licher Privatbrauerei
  Lillebräu
  Lindenbräu
  Löwenbräu 
  Maisel Brau Bamberg
  
  Mönschof
  Neuzeller Kloster Brewery 
  
  Oettinger Beer 
  Paulaner Brewery 
  Pinkus Müller 
  
  Privatbrauerei Hofmühl
  
  Radeberger Brewery 
  
  Rothaus 
  Schanzenbräu
  Schwaben Bräu 
  Spaten-Franziskaner-Bräu 
  Stadtbrauerei Spalt
  St. Erhard 
  
  Sternburg 
  Stuttgarter Hofbräu 
  Tucher Bräu
  Veltins 
  Warsteiner 
  Weihenstephaner
  Wernesgrüner

Best-selling brands

See also

 Beer and breweries by region
 Beer in Germany
 German beer culture (category)
 Reinheitsgebot – German Beer Purity Order

References

External links
 

 
Germany
Lists of companies of Germany
Beer brands of Germany